Max-Weber-Platz is a Munich U-Bahn interchange station on the U4 and U5 lines in the borough of Haidhausen. The station is located under Max-Weber-Platz, just east of the Landtag of Bavaria. The square was originally named after a local politician  but from 1998 also after the more known sociologist.

Max-Weber-Platz station is a transport hub for the Haidhausen quarter, allowing interchange between U-Bahn, bus and tramway services.

In the first entresol, a replica of a historic Munich horsecar wagon (geschlossener Pferdebahnwagen Nr. 87 Typ a 1.41) which has been used between 1876 and 1895 is on display.

References

External links

Munich U-Bahn stations
Railway stations in Germany opened in 1988
1988 establishments in West Germany